The 2020 AFL Tasmania TSL premiership season is an Australian rules football competition staged across Tasmania, Australia over twenty-one (21) home and away rounds and four (4) finals series matches between 11 July and 17 October.

Participating clubs
Clarence District Football Club
Glenorchy District Football Club
Lauderdale Football Club
Launceston Football Club
North Hobart Football Club
North Launceston Football Club
Tigers Football Club

Ladder

Finals series

First semi-final

Second semi-final

Grand Final

References

External links
 Tasmanian State League Website
 AFL Tasmania

2020
2020 in Australian rules football